LA-36 is a constituency of Azad Kashmir Legislative Assembly which is currently represented by Hafiz Hamid Raza of Pakistan Tehreek-e-Insaf. It covers the area of Sialkot Tehsil of Sialkot District in Pakistan. Only refugees from Jammu and Ladakh Settled in Pakistan are eligible to vote.

Election 2016

elections were held in this constituency on 21 July 2016.

Election 2021 
Further Information: Azad Kashmir Election 2021

Azad Kashmir Legislative Assembly constituencies